SOEP may refer to:
 Sable Offshore Energy Project, a natural gas consortium
 Socio-Economic Panel, a dataset of the population in Germany